William Lounsbery (December 25, 1831 – November 8, 1905) was an American lawyer, Civil War veteran, and politician who served one term as a U.S. Representative from New York from 1879 to 1881.

Biography 
Born at Stone Ridge, New York, he was the son of John (1803-1864) and Sarah Peters Lounsbery (1796-1866). He was a descendant of New Paltz founder and Huguenot Louis DuBois and the Hasbrouck family.

Lounsbery was graduated from Rutgers College, New Brunswick, New Jersey, in 1851.
He attended the law department of the New York University in Albany, New York.
He was admitted to the bar in 1853 and engaged in practice.
During the Civil War was commissary of the Twentieth Regiment, New York Militia, with the rank of first lieutenant, during its three months' service.

Political career 
He was member of the New York State Assembly (Ulster Co., 1st D.) in 1868.
He served as the second mayor of Kingston, New York 1878–1879.

Lounsbery was elected as a Democrat to the Forty-sixth Congress (March 4, 1879 – March 3, 1881).

Death 
He died in Kingston, New York, November 8, 1905.

He was interred in the Wiltwyck Rural Cemetery.

Legacy 
Lounsbery Place in Kingston is named after him.

Family 
Physician Laurence H. Snyder is a first cousin twice removed of Lounsbery, and he is also a cousin of Abraham Bruyn Hasbrouck and Abraham J. Hasbrouck.

Sources

External links
 

1831 births
1905 deaths
Rutgers University alumni
American militia officers
Democratic Party members of the New York State Assembly
Democratic Party members of the United States House of Representatives from New York (state)
Politicians from Kingston, New York
Mayors of places in New York (state)
19th-century American politicians